The Bulletin of the School of Oriental and African Studies, founded in 1917 (one year after the foundation of the School) as Bulletin of the School of Oriental Studies, is an interdisciplinary journal of Asian and African studies, published by Cambridge University Press on behalf of the School of Oriental and African Studies. The first editor was also the first director of the School, Edward Denison Ross. The name changed in 1940 as a consequence of the change in the School's name (changed 1938) to incorporate African Studies. Later editors have included Dennis Twitchett (1964–68)  and Robert Mayer and its current editors are Ayman Shihadeh and Nathan W. Hill.

References

Area studies journals
Publications established in 1917
Cambridge University Press academic journals
SOAS University of London